Newhaven Harbour railway station is a railway station in Newhaven, East Sussex, England.

Location

There are two platforms at the station, joined by a footbridge. The station is managed by Southern, which operates all passenger services.

Newhaven Harbour is one of two stations serving the town of Newhaven, alongside Newhaven Town station less than half a mile (0.8 km) to the north. A third station in the town, operated passenger services until 2006 and formally closed in October 2020. Newhaven Harbour station is located on the south side of the town, adjacent to the Port of Newhaven freight terminal and nearby industrial estate. 

Despite the station's name, it no longer serves the passenger ferry terminal − this was taken over by Newhaven Marine station, until the terminal was moved to a site next to Newhaven Town.

History
Boat train services to Dieppe began the following year. The line was extended to Seaford in 1864. 

In 1879, the port was redeveloped, constructing a new east pier and building a new wharf on reclaimed land, which could be run independently of tide times. The station was renamed to Newhaven Harbour on 17 May 1886 when a station to the south, known as Newhaven Harbour (Boat Station), opened to serve the new boat train terminal.

Services
However, as part of a timetable change, most weekday trains on the line no longer call here; the station is only served during peak times, with a total of 8 trains per day each way. Weekend frequency remained unchanged.

References

Sources

External links

Railway stations in East Sussex
DfT Category F1 stations
Former London, Brighton and South Coast Railway stations
Railway stations in Great Britain opened in 1886
Railway stations in Great Britain closed in 1914
Railway stations in Great Britain opened in 1919
Railway stations served by Govia Thameslink Railway
Railway stations serving harbours and ports in the United Kingdom
Newhaven, East Sussex